Spartanburg County School District 5 (SCSD5) is a public school district in Spartanburg County, South Carolina, US. Led by superintendent Dr. Scott Turner, the district operates eleven schools.

List of schools

Elementary schools 
 Abner Creek Academy
 Duncan Elementary School
 Lyman Elementary School
 Reidville Elementary School
 River Ridge Elementary School]
 Wellford Academy

Intermediate schools 
 Beech Springs Intermediate School
 Berry Shoals Intermediate School

Middle and junior high schools
 D.R. Hill Middle School
 Florence Chapel Middle School

High schools
 James F. Byrnes High School

References

External links
Spartanburg School District 5 homepage

School districts in South Carolina
Education in Spartanburg County, South Carolina